William John Caffrey was an Irish Fine Gael politician. He was a member of Seanad Éireann from April to August 1938. He was elected to the 2nd Seanad in April 1938 by the Agricultural Panel. He did not contest the August 1938 Seanad election.

He stood unsuccessfully for Dáil Éireann as a Fine Gael candidate for the Sligo constituency at the 1937 general election. He was a member of Sligo County Council from 1934 to 1945.

References

Year of birth missing
Year of death missing
Fine Gael senators
Members of the 2nd Seanad
People from County Sligo